Ivarans Rederi AS was a merchant steamship company founded in Norway by Ivar Anton Christensen in 1902.
The flag was red with a white "C" in the middle, for the founder's family name: Christensen (a picture of this flag can be viewed at FOTW).

History

Stockard Steamship Corporation
Stockard Steamship Company of New York was the major agent of Ivaran  for many years. Ivaran had an involvement with Stockard resulted from World War II as they operated a tramping service between the East Coast of USA and South America which was previously managed by fellow Norwegian company A/S Holter Sørensens.
In Merchant Ships (The Macmillan Company; 1944),  E.C. Talbot-Booth shows the vessels Ivaran and Lise in the name of Ivaran Lines which fits with the name based New York given by F. J. N. Wedge in Brown’s Flags and Funnels (Brown, Son and Ferguson; 1951). Subsequently Ivarans appear to have re-established in Oslo under their own name.

Stockard Steamship Corporation was active with charter shipping with the Maritime Commission and War Shipping Administration for World War II. The ship was run by its Stockard Steamship Corporation crew and the US Navy supplied United States Navy Armed Guards to man the deck guns and radio.

CP Ships
Ivaran Lines was bought by CP Ships in May 1998, being unprofitable at that time. The last Ivaran's chairman was Eirik Holter-Sorensen. CP's Ivaran brand name was replaced by the Lykes Lines brand in 2000. By 2001 CP Ships was the seventh largest carrier in the world.

When acquired by CP Ships, Ivaran Lines was operating the following services:
 U.S. East Coast to East Coast South America (with Columbus Line and Alianca) 
 U.S. Gulf Coast to East Coast South America (with Grupo Libra and TMM)
 U.S. Gulf Coast to Central America and the Caribbean.

CP Ships was bought out in late 2005 by TUI AG and merged in mid-2006 in the Hapag-Lloyd organization.

International identifiers
SCAC Code: IVAU
BIC Code (Container prefixes): IVLU

Vessels
In the final 1980s and 1990s the fleet was composed of multi-purpose container ships, which had names taken from the Channel Islands, in Southern California, USA:
 Salvador 
 Santa Fe 
 San Diego
 San Clemente
 San Lorenzo
 San Miguel
 San Nicolas
 San Pedro
 San Isidro
 Santa Cruz
 San Francisco(LPG)
 Santos
 São Paulo
 Savannah
 San Luis
 San Nicolas X
 Santa Rosa
 San Marino
 San Martin
 San Juan
 Santa Catarina
 San Antonio
 Santa Margarita

They were also operating a combined container-passenger ship, the Americana.

In 1998, Ivaran Lines had a fleet of 13 container ships with a capacity between 563 and 1742 TEU.

Stockard Steamship World War II
Stockard Steamship operated for World War II ships:
Victory ships:
SS Attleboro Victory

Liberty ships:
SS Dan Beard
SS Daniel Chester French
SS Paul Chandler
SS Joseph C. Lincoln
SS John L. Elliott
SS John W. Garrett
SS George R. Poole
SS Thomas Sinnickson, sank July 7, 1943 torpedoed by U.185 off Brazil 
SS William Crompton
SS Charles N. Cole
SS Jesse Cottrell
SS W. S. Jennings
SS Wendell L. Willkie
SS Edgar E Clark
SS John H. McIntosh
 other
SS Coastal Sentry

See also
 CP Ships
 Hapag-Lloyd

References

Other sources
 SECDatabase.com:  CP SHIPS LTD, Form 6-K, Filing Date Sep 7, 2004
 Locistics Management, 01. May 1998

External links
Maritime Timetable images (Collection of old company brochures)
IVARAN group on facebook (IVARAN group on Facebook)

Defunct shipping companies of Norway
Transport companies established in 1902
1902 establishments in Norway
Transport companies disestablished in 2005
2005 disestablishments in Norway